The Genesis Solar Energy Project is a concentrated solar power station located in the Mojave Desert on  of Bureau of Land Management land, in eastern Riverside County, California. The plant is owned/managed by Genesis Solar, LLC, a subsidiary of NextEra Energy Resources, LLC. The plant was built in the Colorado Desert along an ancient trade route that native people had traveled for thousands of years. The route traversed the Sonoran Desert and enabled trade between the Colorado River and the coast.

The solar power plant consists of two independent 125 MW net (140 MW gross) sections, using solar trough technology. This was one of three of the world's largest solar plants, that began supplying power in 2013 and 2014, located in the deserts of Riverside and San Bernardino counties. The rest are the evaporation ponds, access road, administration buildings and some fenced open area. The 1840 Solar Collector Assemblies are  each, yielding  of total solar aperture.

A June 2014 report details the project's potential impact on bird populations.

Production 
Genesis Solar Energy Project's production is as follows (MWh).

Maximum production was estimated at 580,000 MW·h per year.

See also

Solar power plants in the Mojave Desert
List of solar thermal power stations

References

External links
Nexteraenergyresources.com: Genesis Solar Energy Project — (redesign factsheet)

Energy in Riverside County, California
Energy infrastructure completed in 2014
Solar power stations in California
Solar power in the Mojave Desert
Buildings and structures in Riverside County, California
Lower Colorado River Valley
2014 establishments in California
Solar thermal energy
NextEra Energy